The 1965 Football League Cup Final, the fifth to be staged since the competition's inception, was contested between Leicester City and Chelsea over two legs. Leicester, the holders, were aiming to become the first side to retain the trophy while Chelsea were seeking to become the first London side to win it. Chelsea won 3–2 on aggregate, with all the goals coming in the first leg.

Route to the final

Chelsea

Match reviews
The final was contested over two home-and-away legs, as was customary for the League Cup at the time.

First leg
The first leg took place on 15 March 1965 at Stamford Bridge, Chelsea's home ground. Chelsea took the lead in the match twice, first through Bobby Tambling and then through a penalty kick by captain Terry Venables, but Leicester City equalised on both occasions, via defender Colin Appleton and forward Jimmy Goodfellow. With ten minutes left, Chelsea's Eddie McCreadie received the ball on the edge of his own penalty area and went on a sixty-yard run, dribbling past several Leicester players before slotting the ball past goalkeeper Gordon Banks. The match ended 3–2 in Chelsea's favour. This was in spite of the fact that Chelsea only had ten players on the pitch for most of the match, after Allan Young – in his first and only appearance of the season – had suffered an early injury. (Substitutions were not allowed at the time.)

McCreadie was actually Chelsea's starting left-back by trade; however, due to an injury to forward Barry Bridges, Chelsea manager Tommy Docherty had been forced to deploy McCreadie as an emergency forward, instead of in his usual spot, for the first leg.

Second leg
McCreadie's goal in the first match would ultimately prove to be the difference in the tie. The second leg was played at Leicester's Filbert Street on 5 April and ended in a 0–0 draw, giving Chelsea a 3–2 aggregate win and the League Cup championship. Although Leicester applied strong pressure and were in control of much of the match, they were unable to make a critical breakthrough in their home leg, as both sides kept clean sheets. Chelsea centre-halves Frank Upton and John Mortimore – neither of whom had played in the first leg – performed admirably in the second leg and were instrumental in preventing Leicester from creating chances.

For Chelsea, this marked the first-ever domestic cup title in the club's history (they would not win their first FA Cup until 1970).

Players and officials

First leg

Second leg

Sources:

References

External links
League Cup 1965 at The English Football Archive
First leg facts  at soccerbase.com
Second leg facts  at soccerbase.com
Final line-ups at Football Focus

League Cup Final
League Cup Final
EFL Cup Finals
League Cup Final 1965
League Cup Final 1965
League Cup Final
League Cup Final
League Cup Final